is a Japanese football player currently playing for Veroskronos Tsuno.

Club career stats
Updated to 1 January 2020.

References

External links
Profile at Grulla Morioka
Profile at jleague.com

1988 births
Living people
Association football people from Kagoshima Prefecture
Japanese footballers
J2 League players
J3 League players
Japan Football League players
Sagan Tosu players
Kagoshima United FC players
Iwate Grulla Morioka players
Fujieda MYFC players
J.FC Miyazaki players
Association football forwards
People from Kagoshima